Leo Yerxa is a Canadian visual artist, medallist, and writer. As an illustrator of children's picture books he won the Governor General's Award in 2006. He lived in Ottawa, Ontario, then. He died on September 1, 2017.

Early life and education

Yerxa was born in 1947 on the Little Eagle Reserve, Couchiching First Nation, in northwestern Ontario. He studied graphic arts at Algonquin College (Ottawa), and fine arts at the University of Waterloo (Waterloo, Ontario).

Career

Yerxa began publishing poetry and participating in group art shows in the 1970s, and had his first one-man gallery show at the Thunder Bay National Exhibition Centre and Centre for Indian Art, entitled "Renegade: The Art of Leo Yerxa", 1984.

Yerxa's designs were used for the Series Four 1975 (1976) Summer Olympic Coins. The coins bearing his designs included $5: Marathon Runner; $5: Women's Javelin; $10: Women's Shot Put; and $10: Men's Hurdles. His use of Algonquin art motifs in the design of these coins is considered an early example of Canadian public art expressions of indigenous values and aesthetics.

Yerxa is the author or several books for children, including the critically acclaimed Ancient Thunder. for which he received a Governor General's Literary Award in 2006. and Last Leaf, First Snowflake to Fall,

Visual arts

Group exhibitions
1974 CANADIAN INDIAN ART '74, Royal Ontario Museum, Toronto, Ontario. 
1977 Links to Tradition, Bureau of Indian Affairs and Development. 
1982 Renewal : Masterpiece s of contemporary Indian art from the Museum of Man, organised by Thunder Bay, Ontario. 
1983 Contemporary Indian and Inuit Art of Canada organised by the Bureau of Indian Affairs and Development, for UN-Headquarters, New York.

Individual exhibitions
1974 Evans Gallery, Toronto, Ontario
1975 Evans Gallery, Toronto, Ontario
1978 "bingo," Wells Gallery, Ottawa, Ontario
1978 Guild of Craft, Montreal, Quebec
1979 Guild of Craft, Montreal, Quebec
1980 "Wind, Rain and Snow," Ells Gallery, Ottawa, Ontario
1983 "Last Snows in Spring," Nishnawbe Arts, Toronto, Ontario
1984 "Renegade," Thunder Bay National Exhibition Center and Center for Indian Art, Thunder Bay, Ontario
1986 Galerie Francis Alexandre, Ottawa, Ontario
1988 Galerie Francis Alexandre, Ottawa, Ontario
2017-2018 (October 2017, 4th - February 2018, 25th) "Nordamerika Native Museum", Zurich: "Geschichten aus dem Waldland".

Public commissions
Sketches for Olympic Medal series IV, 1976
Memorial for Ron Shackleton, University of Western Ontario, London, Ontario.

Books

Author and illustrator

1993:Last Leaf, First Snowflake to Fall, Douglas & McIntyre  Orchard Books NY
1995:A Fish Tale, Or, The Little One That Got Away], Douglas & McIntyre 
2006:Ancient Thunder Groundwood Books

Illustrator

1969:Peter Desbarats, What They Used To Tell About, Indian Legends from Labrador, McClelland and Stewart
1994:Armand Garnet Ruffo, Opening in the Sky, Theytus Press 
2001:Tomson Highway, Johnny National, Super Hero, Health Canada (Ottawa, Ontario, Canada),
2002:Al Hunter, Spirit Horses Kegedonce Press 
2014:Joanne Arnott, Halfling Spring: an internet romance Kegedonce Press

Awards

Governor General's Literary Award, Children's literature (illustration) 2006
Amelia Frances Howard-Gibbon Illustrator's Award  1994
Elizabeth Mrazik-Cleaver Canadian Picture Book Award 1994
Mr. Christie's Book Award  1993 
Governor General's Literary Award, Children's Literature, nominee 1993

See also
List of writers from peoples indigenous to the Americas
Royal Canadian Mint Olympic Coins
Governor General's Award for English-language children's illustration
List of Canadian poets

References

External links 

  

1947 births
Living people
Ojibwe people
20th-century First Nations writers
Canadian children's book illustrators
Canadian children's writers
Canadian contemporary painters
Canadian male poets
Writers from Ottawa
Artists from Ottawa
20th-century First Nations painters
21st-century Canadian painters
Canadian male painters
20th-century Canadian poets
20th-century Canadian male writers
21st-century First Nations writers
First Nations poets
20th-century Canadian male artists
21st-century Canadian male artists